Cămin is a commune of 1,406 inhabitants located in Satu Mare County, Romania. It is composed of a single village, Cămin, part of Căpleni Commune until 2002, when it was split off.

At the 2011 census, 64.5% of inhabitants were Hungarians, 22.5% Germans, 7.2% Roma and 5% Romanians.

Natives
 János Scheffler

References

Communes in Satu Mare County